O Primeiro de Janeiro (lit. the first of January) was a Portuguese daily newspaper published in Porto, Portugal.

History and profile
O Primeiro de Janeiro was based in Porto where it was founded in 1868. Its title is a reference to the reform movement initiated on 1 January.

The paper was directed by Eduardo Costa and has a left-liberal stance.

See also
List of newspapers in Portugal

References

External links
 O Primeiro de Janeiro online

Publications established in 1868
Newspapers published in Portugal
Portuguese-language newspapers
Mass media in Porto